The Piedmont Mill Historic District encompasses a historic 19th-century grist mill complex at 1709 Alean Road in rural Franklin County, Virginia.  Located between Wirtz and Burnt Chimney on the banks of Maggodee Creek, it includes an 1866 mill building, an earthen raceway and a 20th-century concrete dam, as well as a metal truss bridge.  In 1870, it was the most powerful mill in the county, which it served under several owners until 1963.

The district was listed on the National Register of Historic Places in 2009.

See also
National Register of Historic Places listings in Franklin County, Virginia

References

Historic districts on the National Register of Historic Places in Virginia
National Register of Historic Places in Franklin County, Virginia
Buildings and structures completed in 1866
Grinding mills in Virginia
Historic districts in Virginia